"I Disappear" is a single by Metallica from the Mission: Impossible 2 soundtrack, which released on May 9, 2000. The music and lyrics were written by James Hetfield and Lars Ulrich, and they were joined by Bob Rock to produce the song.  The song's leak on the file-sharing service Napster prompted the band to sue the service.  The soundtrack single was released on June 2, 2000.

Music video
Most of "I Disappears music video was shot in Monument Valley atop a sandstone butte on April 13, 2000.  After accessing the butte by helicopter, Metallica and their instruments were alone on the plateau, circled by filming aircraft, for over twelve hours.  By the end of the shoot, winds were so severe that the drum kit was blown over, footage of which appears in the video.  Ulrich was later filmed on a skyscraper in Downtown Los Angeles for "action sequences, explosions, chaos and mayhem".

The 2000 music video also featured a 1967 Chevrolet Camaro driven by Metallica band member James Hetfield. Hetfield was given the car after filming, and in 2003, listed it on eBay.

Release
While still working on the song, Metallica learned in 2000 that a pre-release version was being aired on US radio stations.  The band traced the source of the song to the peer-to-peer file sharing service Napster.  After finding their entire catalog available on Napster, they became the first musicians to file lawsuit against the service (Metallica v. Napster, Inc.).  , "I Disappear" was available for streaming via the Napster streaming music service.

"I Disappear" was formally released with the Mission: Impossible 2 soundtrack on May 9, 2000.  The single was released as a CD maxi on June 2, 2000, under the Hollywood Records label.  In Belgium and Italy, the song was released by Edel-Mega Records.  Metallica performed "I Disappear" 93 times from June 3, 2000, through December 19, 2021.

On April 23, 2021, Metallica released the two-track Disappear (Leaked and Live) through their Vinyl Club.  The first song is "I Disappear (Leaked Napster Version)", and the second is "I Disappear (Live)", a live performance recorded at the West Hollywood House of Blues on July 18, 2000.

Critical reception
Music critic Mike McGuirk (of the San Francisco Bay Guardian) described "I Disappear" as leaning on a reworking of "Enter Sandman" with an incorporation of some grunge aesthetic.  McGuirk said that following Metallica's Load, which he called their "country record", this new song with a "mega" riff and "catchy as hell" melodic choruses proved that the band was not afraid to change things up.

Track listing
The CD maxi single of I Disappear has only two tracks, the title song and its instrumental version.
 "I Disappear" (James Hetfield, Lars Ulrich)4:26
 "I Disappear" (Instrumental)4:26

Charts

Certifications

References

External links
 

2000 singles
Hollywood Records singles
Metallica songs
Mission: Impossible (film series)
Mission: Impossible music
song recordings produced by Bob Rock
songs written by James Hetfield
songs written by Lars Ulrich